The monetary policy of China aims to keep the value of the Renminbi, the official currency of the People's Republic of China, stable and contribute to economic growth. Monetary policy concerns the actions of a central bank or other regulatory authorities adopt to manage and regulate currency and credit in order to achieve certain macroeconomic goals.

Formation of steady monetary policy

The steady monetary policy with Chinese characteristics came into being gradually after 1998. The so-called prudent monetary policy means its goal is to use currency stability as a goal, correctly handle the relationship between preventing financial risks and supporting economic growth, and maintain a moderate growth of money supply to support the sustained and rapid health of the national economy while improving the quality of loans. The background of the central government's steady monetary policy mainly includes the following aspects: First, after the real estate and development zone boom of the early 1990s, by 1997 and 1998, the risk of some small and medium-sized financial institutions has become quite prominent. At that time, the Chinese government and the People's Bank of China (PBoC) faced with the important task of resolving financial risks and preventing the emergence of new and more serious financial risks; Second, at the time, although the contradictions of insufficient total social demand have been exposed, the most prominent ones are structural problems, and the actual effective loan demand is insufficient; The long-term implementation of a financial system based on indirect financing of banks, high corporate debt management, and a low proportion of self-owned funds continue to significantly increase the number of loans, and the problem of non-performing loans will become more pronounced. Fourth, the implementation of a proactive fiscal policy will itself include the use of policies, the additional issuance of treasury bonds, and the participation of banks in purchases themselves include the use of monetary policy to support economic growth.

The prudent monetary policy implemented since 1998 has achieved great success. Mainly in four aspects: First, the steady growth of total money and credit. From 1998 to 2001, the growth rate of broad money supply was basically controlled between 14% and 15%. Compared with the ups and downs of currencies and credits in the past years, we finally managed to regulate the growth of money and credit more smoothly. Second, the credit structure has been greatly adjusted. Driven by a series of credit policies, the ratio of personal housing loans, infrastructure loans, and agricultural loans has increased significantly. In the year of the new loans, the above three loans accounted for roughly 70% of the total. This adjustment of the credit structure has effectively promoted the nationals adjustment of economic structure. The third is to maintain domestic financial stability and the stability of the RMB exchange rate. In 1997, some small and medium-sized financial institutions began to have payment problems. In recent years, they used deflationary opportunities to increase refinancing, helped local governments to close down some small and medium-sized financial institutions, and maintained financial stability and social stability. RMB exchange rate stability not only in Asia to make a contribution to the economy and the world economy, also in line with our national interests, in recent years the balance of payments equilibrium, the state foreign exchange reserves continued to increase. The fourth is to basically realize the transition from direct regulation to indirect regulation of monetary policy. In 1998 cancellation of loan quota. In the past few years after the control, open market operations have actually become the main tool for the daily operation of monetary policy.

Monetary policy tools

Open market operations

It refers to the central bank ’s policy of buying and selling government bonds to control the money supply and interest rate in the financial market .

Deposit reserve policy

It means that the central bank imposes a deposit reserve ratio on deposits of commercial banks, etc.

Central Bank Loans

It refers to the central bank to use monetary base to specialized banks, other financial institutions, in a variety of ways of financial intermediation general term.

Interest rate policy

Central bank ’s policies and measures to control and regulate market interest rates in order to influence the supply and demand of social funds .

Exchange rate policy

Lifting of a government using the national currency exchange rate to control the feed exports and capital flows in order to reach the international balance of payments purposes.

Permanent loan facilities

It is a Short-term Liquidity Operation, it is used when there is a temporary fluctuation in the liquidity of the banking system.

2010s policy tools
As well as heralding a market-based approach, the system and its range of tools offers the central bank more autonomy to set policy and marks a significant change for monetary policy making in China.

Starting in 2016, the PBoC has used a market-based approach involving closer management of liquidity in the banking system and an expanded range of tools, such as repos (or reverse repurchase agreements) and lending facilities, to promote better capital allocation and guide market interest rates to more closely match its objectives. The new tools allow the central bank to be more proactive and targeted in how it goes about handling monetary policy.

During the era of low to zero interest-rates, the PBoC maintained moderate interest rates unlike most other major central banks. According to an analyst cited by CNBC, this stabilized the economy and slowed down the rise of property values. Instead the PBoC utilizes targeted tools to stimulate specific areas of the economy, an approach that central banks elsewhere started to follow.

The renminbi currency value is also heavily influenced by other government policy instruments such as capital controls and trade policy, for instance restrictions on the import of gold paid in dollars.

Policy objectives
Pan Gongsheng, deputy governor of the PBoC, stated that the internationalization of the renminbi (currency of China) is a major highlight of China's financial reform in the past decade. They have set new objectives on which to focus their new policy: first, to adhere to the "priority in national currency" and expand the cross-border use of renminbi; second constantly promote the convertibility of the capital account in RMB; third, consolidate the market base for the reform of the exchange rate commodification; finally, improve the macro prudential management framework.

The monetary policy of the PBoC has been among the most adavanced in terms of green finance according to ratings. The PBoC used both window guidance as well as favouring green bonds markets in its open market operations to encourage green finance in China.

References

Finance in China
China
Chinese economic policy